The Crowning with Thorns or Christ Crowned with Thorns is an oil on canvas painting by Titian, executed in 1576, now in the Alte Pinakothek in Munich. It is a typical composition from his final period. and can be compared with an earlier 1542 work of his on the same subject.

References

External links
https://web.archive.org/web/20160325182454/http://www.pinakothek.de/en/tizian/christ-crowned-thorns

1576 paintings
Religious paintings by Titian
Collection of the Alte Pinakothek